Count Pál Széchenyi de Sárvár-Felsővidék (6 November 1838 – 28 October 1901) was a Hungarian politician, who served as Minister of Agriculture, Industry and Trade between 1882 and 1889.

References
 Magyar Életrajzi Lexikon
 	

1838 births
1901 deaths
People from Sopron
Agriculture ministers of Hungary
Pal